The March of Time is an American newsreel series sponsored by Time Inc. and shown in movie theaters from 1935 to 1951. It was based on a radio news series broadcast from 1931 to 1945. The "voice" of both series was Westbrook Van Voorhis. Produced and written by Louis de Rochemont and his brother Richard de Rochemont, The March of Time was recognized with an Academy Honorary Award in 1937.

The March of Time organization also produced four feature films for theatrical release, and created documentary series for early television. Its first TV series, Crusade in Europe (1949), received a Peabody Award and one of the first Emmy Awards.

Production
The March of Time was based on a news documentary and dramatization series, also called The March of Time, that was first broadcast on CBS Radio in 1931. Usually called a newsreel series, The March of Time was actually a monthly series of short feature films twice the length of standard newsreels. The films were didactic, with a subjective point of view. The editors of Time described it as "pictorial journalism". Like its radio namesake, The March of Time included reporting, on-location shots, and dramatic reenactments. The March of Time'''s relationship to the newsreel was compared to the weekly interpretive news magazine's relationship to the daily newspaper.The March of Time was launched February 1, 1935, in over 500 theaters. Each entry in the series was either a two- or three-reel film (20 or 30 minutes). Westbrook Van Voorhis, who hosted the radio program, served as narrator of the film series. The series, which finally totalled close to 200 segments, was an immediate success with audiences. Because of its high production costs—estimated at $50,000 per episode, released at the rate of about one episode per month—the series was a money loser. However, it remained in production for six years beyond the cancellation of the radio show on which it was based.

At its peak The March of Time was seen by 25 million U.S. moviegoers a month.

"Implicit in all March of Time issues was a kind of uncomplicated American liberalism — general good intentions, a healthy journalistic skepticism, faith in enlightened self-interest, and substantial pride in American progress and potential", wrote March of Time chronicler Raymond Fielding:

The men who made the March of Time were not political theorists, they were journalists. For them, fascism, communism, and native demagogues seemed foreign to the American ethic, and they exposed and attacked them accordingly. … A cinematic agent provocateur, the March of Time turned over a lot of rocks, both at home and abroad, and illuminated the creatures it found beneath them. The demagogues and quacks whom they attacked in the 1930s may seem like obvious targets now, but they didn't seem so then. They were popular, powerful, frightening people, and the March of Time stood entirely alone in theatrical motion picture circles as a muckraker.

In late 1936, producer Roy E. Larsen reluctantly left The March of Time to serve as publisher of Life, a weekly news magazine that began publication in November 1936. Time executives had long vacillated over launching such a magazine, but the success of The March of Time's experiments in pictorial journalism overcame the hesitation of the corporation's board of directors. Larsen proposed that the new magazine be named The March of Time, but the name Life was purchased from the owners of a declining periodical. Life magazine was a great success and notable influence on photojournalism throughout its 36-year history.

Louis de Rochemont succeeded Larsen as producer of The March of Time, while Larsen continued to supervise the operations of the series on behalf of the Time corporation.

Examining the subjects of The March of Time, series historian Raymond Fielding found that episodes dealing with a single country and its affairs comprised 32.6 to 36 percent of the entire series. Economic issues were the subject of 10 percent of the episodes, and domestic politics 5 percent. Between 1935 and 1942, approximately 24 percent of the episodes were about war or the threat of war; from December 1941 until the end of World War II nearly every episode dealt with war.

"Although the March of Time was professedly nonpartisan, a clear and persistent antifascist tone was becoming apparent in its analysis of world politics and rising militarism", Fielding wrote. "'Rehearsal for War' [August 6, 1937] was unquestionably anti-Franco, which was exactly what liberal staff members had intended."

During Louis de Rochemont's tenure (1935–1943), 14 percent of the March of Time episodes were about the impact of specific individuals on political, economic and military events — a number that dropped significantly after his departure. De Rochemont's particular interest in the geopolitical role of the world's waterways resulted in 7.5 percent of all episodes devoted to the subject.The March of Time film series ended in 1951, when the widespread adoption of television and daily TV news shows made the newsreel format obsolete. Newsreel series such as Pathé News (1910–1956), Paramount News (1927–1957), Fox Movietone News (1928–1963), Hearst Metrotone News/News of the Day (1914–1967), and Universal Newsreel (1929–1967) continued for a while longer.

Episodes
Unless noted, sources for episode information are The March of Time, 1935–1951 by Raymond Fielding, and the HBO Archive's summary of The March of Time newsreels. Episodes 1.1–1.4 were distributed by First Division Pictures; episodes 1.5–8.13 were distributed by RKO Pictures; episodes 9.1–17.6 were distributed by 20th Century-Fox.

Reviews and commentary
Writing for The Spectator in 1935, Graham Greene favorably contrasted the film with contemporary British news films whose stories he described as "scraps of unimportant material [...] flung without arrangement on to the screen". Praising the producers of The March of Time, Greene suggested that "their fortnightly programmes can be compared with an authoritative article by a special correspondent rather than with a haphazard page of photographs from the Daily Mirror", and went on to discuss the danger of censorship for this nascent news medium in light of England's stronger libel laws and the British Board of Film Censors' decision to severely cut scenes of the Parisian riots related to the Croix de Feu, and to remove the film's final scene revealing the source of the Croix de Feu's funding - an act of censorship that Greene noted as making the film "Fascist in tone".
 Alistair Cooke, The Listener (November 20, 1935) — The March of Time is not the result of bright inspiration. Behind it is ten years' experience with a magazine of the same style; an army of correspondents and cameramen scattered throughout the world; an historical film library it took two years to prepare; a newspaper cutting library as exhaustive as anything extant; and in New York and Chicago a vast research staff alert to trace the origins of any family, war, author, statesman, treaty, or breath or rumour. With no less than this should any other film company irresponsibly compete.
 Bosley Crowther, The New York Times (October 31, 1937) — And now, less than three years old but already an institution, the March of Time is today one of the most successful and forward-looking features on the screen — a dynamic force for the purveyance of information through the medium of the film.
 D. A. Spencer and H. D. Waley, The Cinema Today (1939) — Although the ideal behind these films is to present, as objectively as possible, accounts of world happenings, there is no doubt whatever that they are helping to mould our views on such happenings. In America legislation regulating child labour … has at last passed both Houses of Congress by a narrow margin which is believed to be due to the March of Time. Their film on cancer has done a good deal to arouse the national conscience of America to the evils of the quackery that battens on fear of this scourge, while in England, before the present campaign for National Fitness was under way, their film Food and Physical Training aroused enormous interest and debate in that it brought home to many people's minds the fact that the animals at the zoo are better fed and housed than many of the nation's children.
 Neil Genzlinger, The New York Times (September 2, 2010) — It's hard to know today even what to call these films. (Raymond Fielding, a retired college educator who wrote a book about the series, told me that roughly 290 were made.) '"Newsreels'" seems inadequate; they are longer, more detailed and much more opinionated than the standard-issue newsreels that preceded them. "Documentaries" is closer, but the blaring orchestrations and outlandish voice-overs sound nothing like a modern documentary. It's tempting to give up and label these whats-its a mass-media Neanderthal — an evolutionary dead end; an attempt to merge the tools of newsgathering and filmmaking that had its moment but died out. Except that, once you watch a few and learn about how they were made, you start to see a little March of Time in almost everything: Fox News, The Daily Show with Jon Stewart, the History channel, schlocky reality shows of the I Shouldn't Be Alive variety, PBS's P.O.V. Tom Shales, The Washington Post (September 4, 2010) — Fascinating, enthralling, enlightening—many a superlative applies to these documentary shorts, which have gathered value with the march of time itself and have been rescued from the ravages of time by New York's Museum of Modern Art and the HBO Archive, corporate relative of the series's original creators. … It's something of an irony that The March of Time may be less famous today than a bull's-eye parody of it — a parody that millions have seen, many of them perhaps not even knowing that it is a parody or what it's lampooning. Does News on the March ring a bell? It's the title of the fake-out newsreel that begins the Orson Welles classic Citizen Kane, and it includes wily duplications of all the March of Time trademarks, including the white-on-black transitional title cards, the wall-to-wall musical score and the bombastic narration.

Awards and recognition
 The March of Time received an honorary Academy Award in 1937 "for its significance to motion pictures and for having revolutionized one of the most important branches of the industry — the newsreel."
 On October 27, 1937, The March of Time episode "Conquering Cancer" received the first Clement Cleveland Medal, established by the New York City Cancer Committee of the American Society for the Control of Cancer. "Louis de Rochemont was especially proud of a letter he received from U.S. Surgeon General Parran crediting the film with providing a crucial influence in securing a federal appropriation for the National Cancer Institute", reported March of Time chronicler Raymond Fielding.
 The March of Time episode Norway in Revolt was nominated for an Academy Award for Best Documentary (Short Subject) in 1941.
 Prelude to Victory was nominated for an Academy Award for Best Documentary (Short Subject) in 1942.
 Youth in Crisis was nominated for an Academy Award for Best Documentary (Short Subject) in 1943.
 Atomic Power was nominated for an Academy Award for Best Documentary (Short Subject) in 1946.
 A Chance to Live received the Academy Award for Best Documentary (Short Subject) in 1949.
 Inside Nazi Germany, a 1938 March of Time episode directed by Jack Glenn, was an inductee of the 1993 National Film Registry list in 1993.

Feature films
Four feature-length films were produced by The March of Time.
 The Ramparts We Watch (August 1940, 99 minutes)
 The Story of the Vatican (August 1941, 53 minutes)
 We Are the Marines (December 1942, 70 minutes)
 The Golden Twenties (April 1950, 67 minutes)

Television
In 1949 The March of Time created the first extensive documentary series for television, Crusade in Europe, based on the book by Dwight D. Eisenhower. The ABC series received a Peabody Award and one of the first Emmy Awards (Best Public Service, Cultural or Educational Program). It was followed by Crusade in the Pacific (1951).

In 1965–1966, producer David L. Wolper revived the March of Time title for a series of documentary films produced in association with Time-Life, Inc. The series was not successful.

Cultural references
Dorothy Fields' lyrics for the song "A Fine Romance", introduced by Fred Astaire and Ginger Rogers in the 1936 RKO film Swing Time, include a reference to the newsreel series:

A fine romance, with no kisses.A fine romance, my friend, this is.True love should have the thrills that a healthy crime has.We don't have half the thrills that The March of Time has.

The March of Dimes, a fundraising organization that still exists, was named by Eddie Cantor in 1938 as a play on The March of Time. Because Franklin D. Roosevelt founded the March of Dimes, originally called the National Foundation for Infantile Paralysis, a dime was chosen to honor him after his death.The March of Time series was satirized in Orson Welles's film Citizen Kane (1941) with the News on the March segment showing the life and funeral of the fictional Charles Foster Kane.

The Canadian documentary series The World in Action (1942–1945) was patterned after The March of Time newsreel series.

References

External links

 The March of Time and the American Century (2007) PhD dissertation by Jonathan Stuart Setliff
 The March of Time as Documentary and Propaganda, American Studies Program at the University of Virginia
History of The March of Time 1935-1951 at harappa.com
The March of Time Newsreels and Documentaries
The March of Time at Alexander Street Press– cross-searchable online streaming video collection for available to academic, public and school libraries
The March of Time at the Encyclopedia of American Journalism (limited preview, full eBook requires purchase)
Jack Glenn papers (March of Time director'') at the University of Wyoming - American Heritage Center
"March of Time" newsreel search on Youtube

Newsreels
Films awarded an Academy Honorary Award
RKO Pictures short films
20th Century Fox short films
The March of Time films
American short documentary films
1930s documentary films
American black-and-white films
1940s documentary films
1950s documentary films
1950s American films